Hommelvik Church is a parish church of the Church of Norway in Malvik municipality in Trøndelag county, Norway. It is located in the village of Hommelvik. It is one of the churches for the Hommelvik parish which is part of the Stjørdal prosti (deanery) in the Diocese of Nidaros. The white, wooden church was built in a long church style in 1886 by the architects Johan Wæhre and Osvald Magnus Günther. The church seats about 360 people.

History

The first church in Hommelvik was built in 1886. The new church was consecrated on 25 May 1887 by the Bishop Niels Laache. In 1950, the church was extensively restored under the direction of John Egil Tverdahl.

See also
List of churches in Nidaros

References

Malvik
Churches in Trøndelag
Long churches in Norway
Wooden churches in Norway
19th-century Church of Norway church buildings
Churches completed in 1886
1886 establishments in Norway